The Black Tie Affair is the second studio album by Canadian rapper Maestro Fresh-Wes, released in 1991 on Attic/LMR Records. Singles from the album include "Nothin' at All" and "Conductin' Thangs", the latter which reached #1 on the RPM Cancon chart. The single was also nominated for Rap Recording of the Year at the 1992 Juno Awards. Most of the production was handled by Main Source member K-Cut.

Background 
Following the success of his debut album, Symphony in Effect, Maestro took it upon himself to be a role model, by delivering a more professional and socially conscious effort on his second release. In particular, the songs "Nothin' at All", "Poetry Is Black", "Watchin' Zeros Grow", and "The Black Tie Affair" showcase his conscious lyrics. Maestro used "Nothin' at All" as a way to acknowledge the achievements of prominent Black Canadians, mentioning Egerton Marcus, Ben Johnson, Lennox Lewis, Oscar Peterson, and Salome Bey in the third verse, while criticizing "race scientist" Jean Philippe Rushton in the first verse.

Reception 

In Canada, the album was certified gold with over 50,000 copies sold. The Toronto Star noted the "strong range of musical styles that includes ska and soul, as well as the Maestro's best lyrics yet." The Calgary Herald opined that Wes's "main flaw is letting his mouth wander aimlessly when his artistic inspiration fails."

RapReviews gave it an 8/10 rating, calling Maestro "conscious in the very sense of the word," also stating "the result is an album that reflects both the era's climate and the rapper's personal situation." The song "Nothin' at All" was praised for being "both accusatory and motivational."

Track listing

Samples 
 "Poetry Is Black" – Contains a sample of "Exhibit A" by Boogie Down Productions
 "V.I.P.'s Only" – Contains a sample of "Cold Feet" by Albert King
 "Watchin' Zeroes Grow" – Contains a sample of "Flat Backing" by Blue Mitchell
 "The Black Tie Affair" – Contains a sample of "Sunshine Alley" by Stanley Turrentine
 "The Maestro Zone" - Contains a sample of "Wanoah" by Black Heat
 "Conductin Thangs" - Contains a sample of  "Al Capone" by Prince Buster

Chart positions 
Album

Singles

Personnel 
 Dawn Cumberbatch – Vocals  
 Anthony Davis – Producer  
 Peter Davis – Producer  
 Chris Gehringer – Mastering  
 Maestro Fresh-Wes – Performer  
 Carlos Morgan – Vocals  
 Anton Pukshansky – Keyboards, Mixing  
 Washington Savage – Vocals  
 Lascelles Stephens – Vocal Arrangement  
 Rob White – Assistant Engineer

References 

Maestro Fresh-Wes albums
1991 albums
Attic Records albums
Albums produced by K-Cut (producer)